Dagmara Bollová, also known as Dagmar Bollová (born 16  September 1942 in Kopčany) is a former Slovak politician, who served as an MP of the National Council between 2002 and 2006. She was elected on the Communist Party of Slovakia list. She graduated in Pedagogy from Comenius University and worked as a teacher and secondary school principal. 

In 2006, she participated on an Organization for Security and Co-operation in Europe electoral monitoring mission in Belarus. In spite of witnessing irregularities, Bollová claimed the election were democratic "in line with the local customs". 

In 2009 she ran in the 2009 Slovak presidential election as an independent candidate. She finished sixth, after receiving only 1.1% of the vote.

References

Slovak politicians
1942 births
Living people
Members of the National Council (Slovakia) 2002-2006
Communist Party of Slovakia politicians
Comenius University alumni
People from Skalica District
Female members of the National Council (Slovakia)